Grand Slam most often refers to:
 Grand Slam (tennis), one player or pair winning all four major annual tournaments, or the tournaments themselves

Grand Slam or Grand slam may also refer to:

Games and sports 
 Grand slam, winning category terminology originating in contract bridge and other whist family card games

Auto racing 
 Grand Slam (Formula One), winning from pole position, leading every lap, and setting the fastest lap in a Grand Prix
 Grand Slam (NASCAR), winning all NASCAR Cup Series majors in a calendar year

Baseball 
 Grand slam (baseball), a home run with all bases occupied
 Grand Slam Single (October 17, 1999), the hit that ended Game 5 of the 1999 National League Championship Series between the New York Mets and Atlanta Braves, at Shea Stadium

Equestrian 
 Grand Slam (horse), an American thoroughbred
 Equestrian Grand Slam, any of several events
 Grand Slam of Eventing, three particular world horse trials competitions
 Grand Slam of Show Jumping, one rider winning all three major annual competitions consecutively
 Grand Slam of Thoroughbred racing, the US Triple Crown of Thoroughbred Racing plus either the Travers Stakes or the Breeders' Cup Classic

Golf 
 Grand Slam (golf), one player winning all four major annual tournaments
 PGA Grand Slam of Golf, an annual off-season men's competition

Martial arts 
 Grand Slam Paris, judo competition
 Grand Slam Tokyo, judo competition
 Grand Slam Tel Aviv, judo competition

Tennis 
 Pepsi Grand Slam, an annual men's professional tournament
 Grand Slam Cup, an annual international tournament
 Grand Slam (real tennis), a player or pair winning all four major annual real tennis tournaments

Wrestling
 AEW Grand Slam, an All Elite Wrestling event
 Wrestle Grand Slam in Tokyo Dome, a 2021 New Japan Pro-Wrestling event
 Grand Slam (professional wrestling), winning four professional wrestling championships

Other games and sports 
 Explorers Grand Slam or Adventurers Grand Slam, one person reaching the North Pole, South Pole, and all Seven Summits during a career
 Ocean Explorers Grand Slam, performing open-water crossing on each of the five oceans using human-powered vessel
 Grand Slam (Fly-Fishing Caribbean), one person catching a bonefish, tarpon, and permit during one day of Caribbean fly-fishing
 Grand Slam of Curling, a series of annual curling bonspiels
 Grand Slam of Darts, a major professional darts tournament organised by the Professional Darts Corporation
 Grand Slam of Ultrarunning, for a person finishing four annual 100-mile footraces in the U.S.
 Grand Slam (PBA), one team winning all three major Philippine Basketball Association tournaments in one season
 Grand Slam (figure skating), winning all three major annual senior-level international competitions within a single season
 Grand Slam (rugby union), one national team defeating all others in the Six Nations Championship
 Grand Slam (shinty), one club winning four annual shinty trophies
 Grand slam, in roller derby, a five-point scoring pass
 Grand slam, in ski jumping, winning all four events in the same edition of Four Hills Tournament
 Grand slam, in contract bridge, a contract to win all thirteen tricks in one deal
S2 6.7 Grand Slam, an American racing sailboat design

Entertainment, arts and media 
 Grand Slam (G.I. Joe), a character
 Grand Slam of Hollywood show business, winning Emmy, Grammy, Oscar, and Tony Awards in an American entertainment career (see List of people who have won Academy, Emmy, Grammy, and Tony Awards}
 Grand Slam of Philippine film industry, winning category awards from four major film award-giving bodies in a year (see List of people who won the Philippine movie grand slam)

Films 
 Grand Slam (1933 film), an American comedy
 Grand Slam (1967 film), an Italian heist movie
 Grand Slam (1978 film), a Welsh TV comedy

Music 
 Grand Slam (band), a band formed by Phil Lynott
 Grand Slam, a lineup of Juice Leskinen

Albums 
 Grand Slam (The Isley Brothers album)
 Grand Slam (Magic Slim album)
 Grand Slam (Spiderbait album)
 Grand Slam (Spinners album)

Television 
 50 Grand Slam, a 1976 American game show
 Grand Slam (BBC TV), 1980s televised contract bridge tournaments
 Grand Slam (TV series), a 1990 American action drama
 Grand Slam (British game show), 2003
 Grand Slam (American game show), a 2007 American remake

Video games 
Golf Grand Slam (video game), for the Nintendo NES
Grand Slam Chess Association, a series of annual chess tournaments
Grand Slam Tennis, a 2009 game for the Nintendo Wii
Grand Slam (video game), a 1997 baseball game
Grandslam Entertainment, a video game company
Bilbao Chess Masters Final or Grand Slam Masters Final, a culminating annual chess tournament

Military 
 Grand Slam (bomb), a 10-tonne British "earthquake bomb" of World War II
 Exercise Grand Slam, a 1952 NATO naval exercise in the Mediterranean Sea
 Grand Slam Installation, a modification of the B-36 bomber to add nuclear weapons delivery capability
 Operation Grand Slam, a Pakistan Army offensive plan during the Indo-Pakistani War of 1965
 Operation Grand Slam, the US espionage mission which triggered the 1960 U-2 incident

Other uses 
 Grand Slam breakfast, a dish at Denny's restaurants

See also 
 Operation Grand Slam (disambiguation)
 Slam (disambiguation)